Opinion polling for the 2017 Czech legislative election started immediately after the 2013 legislative election. Monthly party ratings are conducted by Sanep, TNS Aisa, STEM and CVVM.

Graphical summary

Percentage

Poll results are listed in the tables below in reverse chronological order, showing the most recent first. The highest percentage figure in each polling survey is displayed in bold, and the background shaded in the leading party's colour. In case of a tie, then no figure is shaded. Poll results use the date the survey's fieldwork was done, as opposed to the date of publication. However, if this date is unknown, the date of publication will be given instead.

There was an electoral threshold of 5% for political parties, and 10% for party alliances. In 2017 KDU-ČSL and STAN formed a political alliance, meaning they needed 10% to reach the threshold. They later disbanded this coalition.

Aggregate polls
Aggregate polling made by kdovyhrajevolby.cz website.

Election Potential

Individual polls

Seats

Map of voters
Behavio company and Charles University made a poll showing map of voters. According to this poll Civic Democratic Party, Czech Pirate Party, Christian and Democratic Union – Czechoslovak People's Party (as Populars and Mayors) and Green Party and TOP 09 can hold a strongest fight for voters according to the poll. Czech Social Democratic Party might have a problem because many of its voters are going for ANO 2011.

Other surveys

References

2017
2017 Czech legislative election